Heringina is a genus of tephritid  or fruit flies in the family Tephritidae.

Species
Heringina guttata (Fallén, 1814)

References

Tephritinae
Tephritidae genera
Diptera of Europe